Psalm 9 is the ninth psalm of the Book of Psalms, beginning in English in the King James Version: "I will praise thee, O LORD, with my whole heart; I will shew forth all thy marvellous works." In Latin, it is known as "Confitebor tibi, Domine". The topic of the psalm is that the success of evil is only temporary, and in the end, the righteous will endure. Psalm 10 is considered part of Psalm 9 in the Greek Septuagint and in most pre-Reformation Christian Bibles. These two consecutive psalms have the form of a single acrostic Hebrew poem.

The psalm is a regular part of Jewish, Catholic, Lutheran, Anglican and other Protestant liturgies.

Text

King James Version
 I will praise thee, O LORD, with my whole heart; I will shew forth all thy marvellous works.
 I will be glad and rejoice in thee: I will sing praise to thy name, O thou most High.
 When mine enemies are turned back, they shall fall and perish at thy presence.
 For thou hast maintained my right and my cause; thou satest in the throne judging right.
 Thou hast rebuked the heathen, thou hast destroyed the wicked, thou hast put out their name for ever and ever.
 O thou enemy, destructions are come to a perpetual end: and thou hast destroyed cities; their memorial is perished with them.
 But the LORD shall endure for ever: he hath prepared his throne for judgment.
 And he shall judge the world in righteousness, he shall minister judgment to the people in uprightness.
 The LORD also will be a refuge for the oppressed, a refuge in times of trouble.
 And they that know thy name will put their trust in thee: for thou, LORD, hast not forsaken them that seek thee.
 Sing praises to the LORD, which dwelleth in Zion: declare among the people his doings.
 When he maketh inquisition for blood, he remembereth them: he forgetteth not the cry of the humble.
 Have mercy upon me, O LORD; consider my trouble which I suffer of them that hate me, thou that liftest me up from the gates of death:
 That I may shew forth all thy praise in the gates of the daughter of Zion: I will rejoice in thy salvation.
 The heathen are sunk down in the pit that they made: in the net which they hid is their own foot taken.
 The LORD is known by the judgment which he executeth: the wicked is snared in the work of his own hands. Higgaion. Selah.
 The wicked shall be turned into hell, and all the nations that forget God.
 For the needy shall not always be forgotten: the expectation of the poor shall not perish for ever.
 Arise, O LORD; let not man prevail: let the heathen be judged in thy sight.
 Put them in fear, O LORD: that the nations may know themselves to be but men. Selah.

Structure
The Psalm is an acrostic Hebrew poem, and with Psalm 10 forms a single combined work.

Old Testament scholar Hermann Gunkel divided Psalm 9 as follows:
Verses 2-3: hymn-like opening song of thanksgiving
Verses 4-5: main piece of the peace song
Verse 6-17: transition to an eschatological hymn

In describing the structure of Psalm 9/10 there are some quite different approaches. Gunkel rated the Psalm by the alphabetical arrangement as "artificial" or "forced", saying, "One cannot place overly strict demands on the internal coherence of such a forced product. The writer was likely glad to have found a fitting word for each letter; he did not have the literary ability to mould his poem into a fully unified work of art." Anders, by contrast, calls the shape of the Psalm an elegant correspondence of form.

The French theologian Pierre Auffret gives the following structure for Psalm 9:
Psalm 9:2 to 9 corresponds to Psalm 10:6 to 15:
in respect to the heart 
relative to the face 
in respect to the throne 
in respect to the wicked 
in respect to eternity.

Psalm 9 is the first of the acrostic Psalms, covering half of the Hebrew alphabet, with Psalm 10 covering the rest of the alphabet. There is some tension between psalms 9 and 10. Psalm 9 has a tone of victory over evil and its ancient Chaldean title suggests that it was written to celebrate David's victory over Goliath. Then, as the acrostic continues into Psalm 10, the tone becomes a lament: God seemingly stands afar off. Victory over evil may be 'here and not yet'.

Dating
Some scholars question the Davidic authorship of this psalm: Bernhard Duhm and Emil Kautzsch date it to Maccabean times while form critic Hermann Gunkel links it the Persian era.

Uses

Judaism
Verse 4 is found in the repetition of the Amidah on Rosh Hashanah.
Verse 11 is part of Uva Letzion.
Verse 13 is part of Av Harachamim.

Catholic Church
According to the Rule of St. Benedict (530 AD), Psalm 1 to Psalm 20 were mainly reserved for the office of Prime. In the Rule of St. Benedict, Psalm 9 is sung by the Latin version translated in the Greek of the Septuagint; therein, Psalm includes 18 additional verses in Psalm 10. Benedict divided this joint Psalm 9/10 in two parts, one sung to the end of the office of Prime Tuesday and the other ( and ) earlier on Wednesdays. In other words, the first verses of Psalm 9 until Quoniam non in finem erit oblivio pauperis: patientia pauperum non peribit in finem, formed the third and final psalm on Tuesday, the second part of the Psalm (Vulgate according to his view) was recited as the first psalm of the office of the prime Wednesday.

Psalms 9 and 10 were traditionally recited as the fourth and fifth Psalms of Sunday Matins in the Liturgy of non monks clerics and canons. In the current Liturgy of the Hours, Psalm 9 is sung in the Office of Readings for Monday of the first week of the four weekly cycle of liturgical prayers.

Book of Common Prayer
In the Church of England's Book of Common Prayer, this psalm is appointed to be read on the evening of the first day of the month.

Musical settings 
The French hymn and its German translation, "Ich lobe meinen Gott von ganzem Herzen", are a paraphrase of verses from Psalm 9.

Heinrich Schütz wrote a setting of a paraphrase in German, "Mit fröhlichem Gemüte", SWV 105, for the Becker Psalter, published first in 1628.

References

External links 

 
 
 Text of Psalm 9 according to the 1928 Psalter
 Psalms Chapter 9 text in Hebrew and English, mechon-mamre.org
 For the leader; according to Muth Labben: A psalm of David. / I will praise you, LORD, with all my heart; will declare all your wondrous deeds. text and footnotes, usccb.org United States Conference of Catholic Bishops
 Psalm 9:1 introduction and text, biblestudytools.com
 Psalm 9 – God Remembers, Man Forgets enduringword.com
 Psalm 9 / Refrain: You, Lord, have never failed those who seek you. Church of England
 Psalm 9 at biblegateway.com
 Hymns for Psalm 9 hymnary.org

009
Works attributed to David